Marvin Plattenhardt (born 26 January 1992) is a German professional footballer who plays as a left back for Bundesliga club Hertha BSC and the Germany national team.

Club career

1. FC Nürnberg
Plattenhardt started playing for 1. FC Nürnberg II during the 2009–10 season in the Regionalliga Süd. He made nine appearances during the 2009–10 season. He went on to make 21 appearances during the 2010–11 season, eight appearances during the 2011–12 season, and eight appearances during the 2012–13 season. He also played for the first team. He made nine appearances during the 2010–11 season, 11 appearances during the 2011–12 season, 14 appearances during the 2012–13, and 32 appearances during the 2013–14 season.

Hertha BSC
On 20 May 2014, he signed a three-year contract with Hertha BSC. During the 2014–15 season, he made 15 appearances for the first team and two appearances for reserve team. He scored his first goal for the club on 12 December 2015, scoring a free kick in a 4–0 win away to Darmstadt 98. He finished the 2015–16 season with 37 appearances. On 11 March 2017, Plattenhardt scored the winning goal in a 2–1 win over Borussia Dortmund, his seventh competitive league goal, all of which have come from free kicks. He finished the 2016–17 season with 31 appearances. He finished the 2017–18 season with 38 appearances. Plattenhardt scored the winning goal in Hertha's 2022 relegation playoff with Hamburg, rescuing the team from demotion to the 2. Bundesliga.

International career
Plattenhardt was first called up to the senior national team in 2017, for the friendly against Denmark on 6 June 2017, for the 2018 World Cup qualification match against San Marino on 10 June 2017 and for the 2017 Confederations Cup to be held from 17 June to 2 July 2017, making his debut in a friendly match against Denmark on 6 June 2017. Plattenhardt was named in Germany's final 23-man squad for the 2018 FIFA World Cup by Germany manager Joachim Löw on 4 June 2018. On 17 June, he made his World Cup debut during their 1–0 defeat in the opening match against Mexico and played for 78 minutes as he was replaced by Mario Gómez in 79th minute.

Career statistics

Club

International

Honours
Germany U17
UEFA European Under-17 Championship: 2009

Germany
FIFA Confederations Cup: 2017

References

External links

Marvin Plattenhardt at the official Hertha BSC website

1992 births
Living people
People from Filderstadt
Sportspeople from Stuttgart (region)
Footballers from Baden-Württemberg
German footballers
Germany youth international footballers
Germany under-21 international footballers
Germany international footballers
Association football defenders
1. FC Nürnberg II players
1. FC Nürnberg players
Hertha BSC players
Regionalliga players
Bundesliga players
2017 FIFA Confederations Cup players
2018 FIFA World Cup players
FIFA Confederations Cup-winning players